Queen Zixi of Ix, or The Story of the Magic Cloak, is a children's book written by L. Frank Baum and illustrated by Frederick Richardson. It was originally serialized in the early 20th-century American children's magazine St. Nicholas from November 1904 to October 1905, and was published in book form later in 1905 by The Century Company.  The events of the book alternate between Noland and Ix, two neighboring regions to the Land of Oz, and Baum himself commented this was the best book he had written.  In a letter to his eldest son, Frank Joslyn Baum, he said it was "nearer to the "old-fashioned" fairy tale than anything I have yet accomplished," and in many respects, it adheres more closely to the fairy tale structure than the Oz books.

The book was made into the 1914 film The Magic Cloak of Oz. Although no part of the book's story takes place in the Land of Oz, by the time the movie was made, it had become clear that the Oz franchise was Baum's most popular creation.

The copyright to Queen Zixi of Ix was acquired by Dover Publications in 1971, and the book was re-released with its original illustrations and a new introduction by Martin Gardner. Like all books published in the U.S. before 1923, it is now in the public domain.

Plot
On the night of a full moon, the fairies ruled by Queen Lulea are dancing in the Forest of Burzee.  Lulea calls a halt to it, for "one may grow weary even of merrymaking".  To divert themselves, another fairy recommends that they make something they can imbue with fairy magic.  After several ideas are considered and rejected, the fairies decide to make a magic cloak that can grant its wearer one wish.  The fairy who proposed it, Espa, and Queen Lulea agree that such a cloak will benefit mortals greatly.  However, its wish-granting power cannot be used if the cloak is stolen from its previous wearer.  After the fairies finish the golden cloak, Ereol arrives from the kingdom of Noland whose king has just died.  On the advice of the Man in the Moon, Ereol is dispatched to Noland to give the magic cloak to the first unhappy person she meets.

Meanwhile, Noland's five high counselors assemble in the capital city of Nole and refuse to allow the valet Jikki to ring the bell that indicates the king has died until they decide how to choose his successor.  Retrieving the book of the law of Noland (to be used only when the king is unavailable, for the king's will is law in Noland), the counselors learn that the forty-seventh person to pass through Nole's eastern gate at sunrise is to be declared king or queen.  The next day, the five counselors assemble at the eastern gate and count off the procession entering Nole.  Number forty-seven turns out to be Timothy (who everyone calls "Bud"), the orphaned son of a ferryman who, with his sister Meg (nicknamed "Fluff"), is entering town with their stern Aunt Rivette, a laundress for the city of Nole.  Along the way from their house to Nole, Ereol meets Fluff and gives her the magic cloak due to her unhappiness at Bud's ill treatment by Rivette.  The power of the cloak is first seen when Fluff wishes she could be happy again, and she becomes so.  Bud—now King Bud—is welcomed by the high counselors and the people of Nole as their new king.  His sister Fluff becomes Princess Fluff, and they take residence in the royal palace.

Aunt Rivette is relegated to an upper room of the palace.  While Bud and Fluff glory in their new positions of authority and their possessions, Aunt Rivette wants to spread the news of her good fortune to her friends.  She asks Fluff if she can wear her cloak, and she becomes so tired walking that she wishes she could fly.  Two wings sprout from Aunt Rivette's back, causing her to panic at first, but she soon becomes very adept at using them.  On its way back to the Princess, the cloak passes through the hands of the king's counselors and the king's valet, each of whom have their wishes immediately granted.

The minstrel Quavo crosses from Noland over a steep mountain range into the land of Ix, whose witch-queen ruler Zixi learns of the magic cloak and seeks to use it to make her reflection in a mirror as beautiful as she has made herself.  Zixi is 683 years old, but her magic has allowed her to appear sixteen for a long time; however, the queen's reflection appears as old as she truly is.  (This contradicts The Road to Oz in which the Wizard of Oz refers to Queen Zixi as having lived thousands of years—of course, he may simply have been mistaken; or, the Magic Cloak story may simply have taken place many years prior.) Believing that Princess Fluff would not simply give her the cloak to use since Ix and Noland aren't on speaking terms, Queen Zixi disguises herself and opens a school for witchery in Noland.  Princess Fluff arrives as one of the pupils in her second-best cloak; Zixi is discovered to be a would-be thief when she demands the Princess wear the other, magic cloak.  Next, Zixi leads the royal army of Ix to conquer Noland, but the counselors use their wish-granted abilities to repel the invaders back across the mountains.

Zixi disguises herself again and arrives at the royal palace of Noland to be hired as a serving maid to Princess Fluff.  When she is alone in the Princess' chamber, Zixi summons imps to make a replica of the magic cloak and replace the Princess' magic cloak with that one.  She is not caught in the theft, but when Zixi tries to use the cloak herself, its power fails because she stole it.  Believing that its power is gone, Zixi leaves the cloak in the forest.  The queen of Ix is sorrowful until she realizes through encounters with an alligator that wants to climb a tree, an owl that wants to swim like a fish, and a girl who wants to be a man, that she has been foolish to be unhappy with her lot.

The Roly-Rogues live on a high plateau above Noland and Ix.  When one of the ball-shaped people accidentally bounces into Noland and views the city of Nole, they decide to conquer Noland in preference to constantly fighting among themselves.  Even with their wish-granted abilities (the general wished himself ten feet tall, the lord high executioner wished for stretching arms, etc.), King Bud's counselors and Nole are soon overwhelmed by the invaders.  King Bud, Princess Fluff, Aunt Rivette, and lord high steward Tallydab (who wished for his dog Ruffles to talk) escape and plan to retrieve the magic cloak which they believe is in the palace.  Aunt Rivette carries Bud and Fluff to the palace and they battle past the Roly-Rogues, but when Bud puts on the cloak (since he hadn't made his wish yet; he was saving it) and wishes the Roly-Rogues away, nothing happens.  Caught aback, Aunt Rivette takes her niece and nephew in flight with her to Ix on the opposite side of the mountain range that the Roly-Rogues came from.

Welcomed by Queen Zixi, who confesses that she stole the real magic cloak, Princess Fluff promises that she will let her use it after the Roly-Rogues are defeated.  When they arrive where Zixi had left the cloak in the forest, it's gone and the party mounts a search to find it.  Along the way, Zixi notes that the alligator, owl, and girl have become satisfied with who each of them are.  The cloak was found by Edi, a shepherd who took it to Dame Dingle, a local seamstress.  The seamstress reveals that she cut the cloak in half, used one half, and gave the other away.  Zixi, Bud, Fluff, Rivette, Tallydab, and Ruffles track down the remaining pieces of the cloak, but one of them cannot be retrieved because the woman who had it sewed it into a necktie for her seaman son, and he won't be back home for a year.

Without the complete cloak, Bud can't wish the Roly-Rogues away.  Queen Zixi uses the contents of a Silver Vial mixed in with their soup to defeat the Roly-Rogues.  They're put to sleep for ten hours in which time Zixi and her army tie the tucked-in creatures up (when they sleep or roll, the Roly-Rogues retract their heads, arms, and feet) and send them all bobbing in the river on the Ix side of the mountain range.  King Bud and his allies retake Nole, and the lands of Noland and Ix declare lasting friendship between them.

Later that year, the sailor whose necktie had the last piece of the magic cloak returns home and presents a necktie similar in appearance to King Bud, for he'd lost the other one at sea.  Enraged, King Bud is about to have the sailor and his mother put in prison, when Queen Lulea of the fairies appears to take the cloak away because it has caused so much trouble.  She undoes the foolish wishes that the cloak granted, allowing the wiser ones to remain, and graciously allows Bud to use the cloak for one last wish: "that I may become the best king that Noland has ever had!"  Lulea will not grant Zixi's wish to see her own beauty, because the fairies do not approve of those who practice witchcraft.  Queen Zixi returns to her kingdom, to rule it with kindness and justice—but, with her wish unfilfilled, must always beware of a mirror.

Setting

The story takes place in the two kingdoms of Noland and Ix, which Baum places across the Impassable Desert to the north of the Land of Oz.

Film adaptation
In 1914, the Oz Film Manufacturing Company produced a five-reel feature film version of Queen Zixi of Ix titled The Magic Cloak of Oz. The initial distributor of the film, Paramount Pictures, backed out because of poor results from an earlier Oz film, The Patchwork Girl of Oz.   The Magic Cloak of Oz was released by the National Film Corporation in 1917.

Other notes
King Bud, Princess Fluff, and Queen Zixi also appear in Baum's fifth Oz book, The Road to Oz.

Ix was later visited in The Silver Princess in Oz where it is home to King Chillywalla of Boxwood and his subjects, the Boxers, who box up everything, including their own bodies down to individual features.  Zixi does not appear in the story.  Kabumpo says there is no time to meet Queen "Zixie" [sic].

References

External links

 A discussion of the book (Archived copy)
 
 

1905 American novels
1905 fantasy novels
Children's fantasy novels
American children's novels
Novels first published in serial form
Books by L. Frank Baum
Zixi
Zixi
Zixi
Works originally published in St. Nicholas Magazine
American fantasy novels adapted into films
1905 children's books
Zixi